John Roger Spottiswoode (born 5 January 1945) is a Canadian-British director, editor and writer of film and television.

Early life
He was born in Ottawa, Ontario, Canada, and was raised in Britain. His father Raymond Spottiswoode was a British film theoretician who worked at the National Film Board of Canada during the 1940s, directing such short films such as Wings of a Continent.

Career
In the 1960s, Roger entered the British film industry as a trainee editor where he apprenticed under editor John Bloom. In the early 1970s Spottiswoode edited several films for Sam Peckinpah.

He wanted to direct and Walter Hill advised him the best way in was to write a script. Hill and Spottiswoode collaborated on the scripts for 48 Hours and the never-made The Last Gun.  

Spottiswoode turned to directing in the early 1980s and has since directed a number of notable films and television productions, including Under Fire (1983) and the 1997 James Bond film Tomorrow Never Dies starring Pierce Brosnan. Spottiswoode was a member of the writing team responsible for 48 Hrs. starring Eddie Murphy and Nick Nolte. In 2000, he directed the science fiction action thriller The 6th Day starring Arnold Schwarzenegger.

Filmography

Film

As editor
 Straw Dogs (1971)
 Pat Garrett and Billy the Kid (1973)
 The Gambler (1974)
 Hard Times (1975)

As writer
 48 Hrs. (1982)

Television

TV movies
 The Last Innocent Man (1987)
 Third Degree Burn (1989)
 And the Band Played On (1993)
 Hiroshima (1995)
 Murder Live! (1997)
 Noriega: God's Favorite (2000)
 The Matthew Shepard Story (2002)
 Ice Bound: A Woman's Survival at the South Pole (2003)
 The Beach House (2018)

Awards and nominations 

Won
 1982: Festival du Film Policier de Cognac Special Jury Prize: The Pursuit of D. B. Cooper 
 1993: Montreal World Film Festival Special Grand Jury Prize: And the Band Played On 
 1995: Gemini Award for Best Direction in a Dramatic Program or Mini-Series: Hiroshima
 2003: Hamptons International Film Festival Audience Award for Best Narrative Feature: Spinning Boris 
 2007: Cinéfest Sudbury International Film Festival Audience Award: Shake Hands with the Devil 
 2007: Cinéfest Sudbury International Film Festival Award for Best Canadian Film: Shake Hands with the Devil 
 2008: Beverly Hills Film Festival Jury Award: Shake Hands with the Devil 

Nominated
 1983: Edgar Award for Best Motion Picture: 48 Hrs. - with Walter Hill, Larry Gross, Steven E. de Souza
 1988: CableACE Award for Directing a Movie or Miniseries: The Last Innocent Man 
 1988: NAACP Image Award for Best Motion Picture: Shoot to Kill
 1994: Directors Guild of America Award for Outstanding Directing – Miniseries or TV Film: And the Band Played On 
 1994: Primetime Emmy Award for Outstanding Directing for a Limited Series, Movie, or Dramatic Special: And the Band Played On 
 1995: CableACE Award for Directing a Movie or Miniseries: And the Band Played On 
 2008: Genie Award for Best Achievement in Direction

References

External links
 
 
 Roger Spottiswoode at Northernstars.ca

1945 births
Living people
British film directors
British male screenwriters
Film directors from Ottawa
Writers from Ottawa
British film editors